Memorial Parkway may refer to:
Memorial Parkway (Huntsville), Alabama, a freeway that carries US 231 and US 431
Memorial Parkway, Texas, a neighborhood in Harris County
Utica Parks and Parkway Historic District, in Utica, New York